Wang Haitao (born 2 December 1989) is a Chinese wheelchair curler. He participated at the 2014, 2018 Winter Paralympics and 2022 Winter Paralympics, winning two gold medals in 2018 and 2022.

Career
He participated in several editions of World Wheelchair Curling Championships and won two bronze, one silver medal, and most recently won the 2021 World Wheelchair Curling Championship, in addition to winning the 2022 Winter Paralympics gold medal.

Teams

References

External links 
 Player profile, Pyeongchang2018.com (web archive)
 Haitao Wang Pictures, Getty
 
 

 Video: 

1989 births
Living people
Chinese male curlers
Chinese wheelchair curlers
Paralympic wheelchair curlers of China
Paralympic medalists in wheelchair curling
Paralympic gold medalists for China
Wheelchair curlers at the 2014 Winter Paralympics
Wheelchair curlers at the 2018 Winter Paralympics
Wheelchair curlers at the 2022 Winter Paralympics
Medalists at the 2018 Winter Paralympics
Medalists at the 2022 Winter Paralympics
World wheelchair curling champions
21st-century Chinese people